Lusenga Plain National Park is a national park in the Kawambwa District, Luapula Province of Zambia, to the south-east of Lake Mweru.

Originally a grounds for hunting, Lusenga Plain was converted into one of Zambia's national parks in 1972. Featuring one of Zambia's highest amount of rainfall, the plain experiences about 1500 millimeters of rain yearly. The Kalungwishi River flows through the park and includes Zambia's second highest waterfall: Lumangwe Falls.  Originally experiencing a dearth of wildlife, the reintroduction of species began in 2007. Species reintroduced include the Grant's zebra, puku and impala. By Kundabwika Falls rests rock paintings.

Lusenga Plain National Park has a cultural significance to two different groups. The Luda people, led by Chief Mwata Kazembe, celebrate the Umutomboko Ceremony, and Senior Chief Mushota leads his Chishinga people in the yearly Chishinga Malaila Ceremony.

References

External links 

 Overview of Lusenga Plain at APAAT
 Lusenga Plain National Park at thebestofzambia.com

National parks of Zambia
Geography of Northern Province, Zambia
Tourist attractions in Northern Province, Zambia
Central Zambezian miombo woodlands